Gray is a rural locality in the local government area (LGA) of Break O'Day in the North-east LGA region of Tasmania. The 2016 census recorded a population of 69 for the state suburb of Gray.

History 
Gray was gazetted as a locality in 1968. 

The area was previously known as Thompsons Marsh.

Geography
The Break O’Day River forms part of the south-western boundary.

Road infrastructure 
Route A4 (Elephant Pass Road) passes through from north-west to east.

References

Towns in Tasmania
Localities of Break O'Day Council